The Doubles luge competition at the 1992 Winter Olympics in Albertville was held on 14 February, at La Plagne.

Results

References

Luge at the 1992 Winter Olympics
Men's events at the 1992 Winter Olympics